Wolfgang Goler (died 1527) was a Roman Catholic prelate who served as Bishop of Grosseto (1527).

Biography
On 25 February 1527, Wolfgang Goler was appointed during the papacy of Pope Clement VII as Bishop of Grosseto.
He served as Bishop of Grosseto until his death in July 1527.

References

External links and additional sources
 (for Chronology of Bishops) 
 (for Chronology of Bishops)  

16th-century Italian Roman Catholic bishops
Bishops appointed by Pope Clement VII
Bishops of Grosseto
1527 deaths